Kulia Union is a Union parishad of Mollahat Upazila, Bagerhat District in Khulna Division of Bangladesh. It has an area of 41.91 km2 (16.18 sq mi) and a population of 17,101.

References

Unions of Mollahat Upazila
Unions of Bagerhat District
Unions of Khulna Division